Guerrouch is a region of Algeria within the Petite Kabylie of the Tell Atlas Mountain Range. The Guerrouch is one of the few remaining habitats for the endangered primate Barbary macaque, Macaca sylvanus; prehistorically this primate had a much wider distribution, prior to deforestation activity by the expanding human population.

See also
 Barbary macaque

References
 C. Michael Hogan (2008) Barbary Macaque: Macaca sylvanus, Globaltwitcher.com, ed. N. Strõmberg
 Protected Areas and World Heritage Programme (1988) Algeria

Line notes

Geography of Algeria